Reuven Rubinstein (1938-2012)() was an Israeli scientist known for his  contributions to Monte Carlo simulation, applied probability, stochastic modeling and stochastic optimization, having authored more than one hundred papers and six books.

During his career, Rubinstein has made fundamental and important contributions in these fields and has advanced the theory and application of adaptive importance sampling, rare event simulation, stochastic optimization, sensitivity analysis of simulation-based models,  the splitting method, and counting problems concerning NP-complete problems.

He is well known as the founder of several breakthrough methods, such as
the score function method, stochastic counterpart method and cross-entropy method,  which have numerous applications in combinatorial optimization and simulation.

His citation index is in the top 5% among his colleagues in operations research and management sciences. His 1981 book "Simulation and the Monte Carlo Method", Wiley (second edition 2008 and third edition 2017, with Dirk Kroese) alone has over 9,000 citations.
He has held visiting positions in various research institutes, including Columbia University, Harvard University, Stanford University, IBM and Bell Laboratories. He has given invited and plenary lectures in many international conferences around the globe.

In 2010 Prof. Rubinstein won the INFORMS Simulation Society highest prize
- the Lifetime Professional Achievement Award (LPAA), which recognizes scholars who have made fundamental contributions to the field of simulation that persist over most of a professional career.

In 2011 Reuven  Rubinstein won from the Operations Research Society of Israel (ORSIS) the Lifetime Professional Award (LPA), which recognizes scholars who have made fundamental contributions to the field of operations research over most of a professional career and constitutes ORSIS's highest award.

Publications
Rubinstein R.Y., "Simulation and the Monte Carlo Method", Wiley, 1981.
Rubinstein, R.Y. and A. Shapiro, "Discrete Event Systems: Sensitivity Analysis and Stochastic Optimization", Wiley, 1993.
Rubinstein, R.Y., "The cross-entropy method for combinatorial and continuous Optimization", Methodology and Computing in Applied Probability, 2, 127—190, 1999.
Rubinstein R.Y., "Randomized algorithms with splitting: Why the classic randomized algorithms do not work and how to make them work", Methodology and Computing in Applied Probability, 2009. 
Rubinstein R.Y. and D.P. Kroese, "The Cross-Entropy Method: a Unified Approach to Combinatorial Optimization, Monte-Carlo Simulation and Machine Learning", Springer, 2004.
Rubinstein R.Y. and D.P. Kroese, "Simulation and the Monte Carlo Method", Second Edition, Wiley, 2008.
Rubinstein R.Y. and D.P. Kroese, "Simulation and the Monte Carlo Method", Third Edition, Wiley, 2017.

References

Israeli Jews
Israeli mathematicians
Israeli operations researchers
Columbia University staff
Harvard University staff
Stanford University staff
1938 births
2012 deaths
Jewish systems scientists